Souleymane Boum (born January 26, 1999) is an American college basketball player. He plays for the Xavier Musketeers of the Big East Conference. He previously played for the San Francisco Dons and the UTEP Miners.

Boum starred at Oakland Technical High School, where he was twice named Oakland Athletic League player of the year. His success in high school and on the AAU circuit led to a scholarship offer from the nearby University of San Francisco, where he quickly earned a starting spot and was named to the West Coast Conference All-Freshman team. Following the season, he transferred to UTEP. In three seasons at UTEP, Boum proved an effective scorer, averaging 16.9 points per game.

Boum then transferred to Xavier for the extra season of eligibility granted by the NCAA for players whose careers were affected by COVID-19. Boum moved to the point guard position and led the Musketeers to a second-place finish in the Big East Conference. He passed the 2,000 career point milestone on December 3, 2022, in a game against West Virginia. At the close of the regular season he was named first-team All-Big East.

Boum is of Guinean descent, born after his mother emigrated to the United States.

References

External links
Xavier Musketeers bio
UTEP Miners bio
San Francisco Dons bio
College stats @ sports-reference.com

1999 births
Living people
American men's basketball players
American people of Guinean descent
Basketball players from Oakland, California
Point guards
San Francisco Dons men's basketball players
Shooting guards
UTEP Miners men's basketball players
Xavier Musketeers men's basketball players